Aptech Limited is an Indian vocational training services provider headquartered Mumbai.

Notable achievements 
 Aptech Limited has been recognized as a great place to work (2017 & 2019)
 Aptech won the Golden Peacock National Training Award (2019)
 Aptech has been appraised at Maturity Level 5 of People Capability Maturity Model (PCMM) in the year 2020
 Media and Entertainment Skills Council (MESC) in association with Aptech Ltd’s two major brands Arena Animation and MAAC (Maya Academy of Advanced Cinematics) organised India’s First and largest media job festival.

References

Further reading
 AI and automation to create more jobs opportunities for IT sector
 How professionals are using e-learning to be relevant at workplace?

Software companies of India
Software companies based in Mumbai
Education companies established in 1986
Indian companies established in 1986
1986 establishments in Maharashtra
Companies listed on the Bombay Stock Exchange
Companies listed on the National Stock Exchange of India